Akon Bora is an Indian National Congress politician from Assam. He has been elected in  Assam Legislative Assembly election in 2006 and 2011 from Dispur constituency.

Early life
Bora was born in Majuli, Assam to Dharmeshwar Bora and Doibaki Bora. He graduated with a Bachelor of Arts degree in political science.

Career
He has held the position of General Secretary, APCC from 1986 to 2009, General Secretary of NECCC and as a member of AICC. He is also a patron and advisor in various Bihu Committee, Social Groups, Mandir Committees and Private Organisations.

Personal life
He married Parul Bora on 3 March 1975. They have a son and a daughter. Bora resided in  Seuj Nagar, Beltola in Guwahati.

References

1952 births
Living people
Indian National Congress politicians from Assam
People from Majuli district
Assam MLAs 2016–2021
Assam MLAs 2006–2011
State cabinet ministers of Assam